In the Bible, Tertullus (a modification of "Tertius") was a lawyer, who was employed by the Jews to state their case against Paul in the presence of Felix (Acts 24:1-9).

The charges he raised against the apostle were "First, that he created disturbances among the Romans throughout the empire, an offence against the Roman government (crimen majestatis). Secondly, that he was a ringleader of the sect of the Nazarenes; disturbed the Jews in the exercise of their religion, guaranteed by the state; introduced new gods, a thing prohibited by the Romans. And thirdly, that he attempted to profane the temple, a crime which the Jews were permitted to punish."

It is generally assumed that Tertullus was himself a Hellenistic Jew, though he could have been a Gentile. It is not certain whether the trial would have taken place in Latin or Greek.

Tertullus before Antonius Felix makes the first recorded use of the plural "Nazarenes" (the plural form of the Iesous ho Nazoraios "Jesus of Nazareth") to refer to Christians, though the use of the term "Christians" is already used at Antioch, and by Herod Agrippa II in the next trial of Paul before Porcius Festus. Tertullus' use of the Greek term Nazoraioi has continuity with the Hebrew term Notzrim found in later rabbinical literature. Tertullus presumably could not use the Antioch term Christianoi (Hebrew Meshiykhiyyim משיחיים) since Christianoi from Greek Christos (literally "Anointed One", "Messiah") might imply Tertullus' recognition of Jesus of Nazareth as a Davidic "Anointed One," or "Messiah."

References

Attribution

People in Acts of the Apostles
Ancient lawyers